Freezing Point (Chinese: 冰点, Bīngdiǎn) was a news journal in the People's Republic of China which was the subject of controversy over its criticism of Communist Party officials and the sympathetic ear it lent to a Chinese historian who had criticized official history textbooks.

History and profile
Freezing Point was started in 1995 as a one-page publication and was expanded into a weekly magazine in 2004. A weekly supplement to China Youth Daily, it was temporarily closed down by officials 24 January 2006, but was allowed to reopen in March that year, though without its former editor Li Datong and without Taiwan-based columnist Lung Yingtai.

The official reason for the January 2006 shutdown of Freezing Point was an article by history professor Yuan Weishi of Sun Yat-sen University (Zhongshan University). The article dissented from the official view of the Boxer Rebellion.

See also
 List of magazines in China
 Censorship in the People's Republic of China

Notes

External links
Freezing Point on China Digital Times
"Chinese Journal Closed by Censors Is to Reopen", The New York Times, 16 February 2006.
 "History Textbooks in China," by Yuan Weishi, and translations of articles on the closing of Bingdian, Feb. 2006 

1995 establishments in China
News magazines published in Asia
Chinese-language magazines (Simplified Chinese)
Political magazines published in China
Weekly magazines published in China
Magazines established in 1995
Newspaper supplements